Round Mountain is a mountain range located in Adirondack Mountains of New York located in the Town of Wells northwest of the hamlet of Wells.

References

Mountains of Hamilton County, New York
Mountains of New York (state)